Mac Burgess was an English professional football manager who coached French team Le Havre between 1934 and 1935.

References

Year of birth missing
Year of death missing
English football managers